Glyn Neath railway station served the town of Glynneath, in the historical county of Glamorganshire, Wales, from 1851 to 1964 on the Vale of Neath Railway.

History 
The station was opened on 24 September 1851 by the Vale of Neath Railway. It closed on 15 June 1964.

References 

Disused railway stations in Neath Port Talbot
Former Great Western Railway stations
Beeching closures in Wales
Railway stations in Great Britain opened in 1851
Railway stations in Great Britain closed in 1964
1851 establishments in Wales
1964 disestablishments in Wales